The jugerum or juger (or ) was a Roman unit of area, equivalent to a rectangle 240 Roman feet in length and 120 feet in width (about 71×35½m), i.e. 28,800 square Roman feet or about hectare (0.623 acre).

Name

Pliny the Elder states:

That portion of land used to be known as a "jugerum," which was capable of being ploughed by a single "jugum," or yoke of oxen, in one day; an "actus" being as much as the oxen could plough at a single spell, fairly estimated, without stopping. This last was one hundred and twenty feet in length; and two in length made a jugerum.

Pliny (Book VIII, Chapter 16) also used jugerum as a measure of length.  The translator (Bostock) speculated that the jugerum length measurement was equivalent to the Greek plethron, about 30 meters or 100 feet. This was based on Pliny translating Aristotle's "plethron" to "jugerum".

Thus, the  contained 288  (Varro, R. R. l.c.). The  was the common measure of land among the Romans. These divisions were derived from the original assignment of landed property, in which two  were given to each citizen as heritable property.

Columella states:

The square actus is bounded by 120 feet each way: when doubled it forms a iugerum, and it has derived the name iugerum from the fact that it was formed by joining.

In Gaul, half of a jugerum was called an arepennis, the origin of the later French unit of area, the arpent.

See also
 Ancient Roman units of measurement

Notes

References

Citations

General bibliography 
 A Dictionary of Greek and Roman Antiquities (1842)

Units of area
Ancient Roman units of measurement